Big Open Skull is an outdoor 1966–1973 bronze sculpture by Jack Zajac, installed outside the San Diego Museum of Art in San Diego's Balboa Park, in the U.S. state of California.

See also

 1973 in art

References

External links
 

1973 sculptures
Bronze sculptures in California
Outdoor sculptures in San Diego
Sculptures of the San Diego Museum of Art